Ritual Entertainment was an American video game developer established in 1996 by Robert Atkins, Mark Dochtermann, Jim Dosé, Richard 'Levelord' Gray, Michael Hadwin, Harry Miller, and Tom Mustaine. Based in Dallas, Texas, Ritual Entertainment was formerly known as Hipnotic Interactive, during which period they began development of their signature video game SiN.

History
Members of the Ritual Entertainment development team have contributed assets to other games such as American McGee's Alice, Medal of Honor: Airborne, Tomb Raider: Legend, and 25 to Life, and are also the creators of "Übertools" for id Tech 3, which has been licensed for a number of other games.

Shortly after signing Hipnotic, publisher Activision claimed that Hipnotic had been at the core of the Duke Nukem 3D development team. Duke Nukem 3D developer 3D Realms vigorously denied this, stating that only five members of Hipnotic Interactive were former staff of 3D Realms, and of these five only three had a significant role in making Duke Nukem 3D.

In late 1997, Hipnotic changed their name to Ritual Entertainment in order to avoid a trademark conflict with another video-game developer, Hypnotix.

On January 24, 2007, developer MumboJumbo announced the acquisition of Ritual Entertainment. With this acquisition, Ritual's focus on traditional action-oriented games was changed to casual games, essentially "stalling" Ritual's latest game series, SiN Episodes, after releasing only one episode out of a planned nine.

The purchase followed months of departures of several key employees, including chief executive officer Steve Nix, who became director of business development at id Software, vice president and co-founder Tom Mustaine, who left to found Escalation Studios. Several months after the acquisition, community relations manager Steve Hessel left the company to join Splash Damage.

Prior to the announcement, on December 6, 2006, Ritual announced the appointment of Ken Harward as the company's new studio director.

Following the company's closure, many of the deveopers have left to other companies such as id Software, Gearbox Software, Nerve Software, Escalation Studios, and the now-defunct Paradigm Entertainment.

Games developed

Unreleased
 The Lord of the Rings: The Two Towers (PC) – canceled
 SiN II publisher demo (2003, PC) – Ritual Entertainment made a game demo to show potential publishers.
 Legacy of Kain: The Dark Prophecy (2004) – canceled
 SiN Episode 2 – canceled
 Quake 4: Awakening – unreleased expansion pack for Quake 4

References

External links
Official website via Internet Archive
Ritualistic - Ritual's Online Community Hub

Companies based in Dallas
Video game companies established in 1996
Video game companies disestablished in 2007
Defunct video game companies of the United States
Video game development companies
Defunct companies based in Texas
1996 establishments in Texas
2007 disestablishments in Texas